Ginevra may refer to:

 Ginevra (given name), a variant spelling of the given name Juniper
 Ginevra, the Italian form of Geneva
 Ginevra, an 1882 poem by Samuel Rogers relating the Legend of the Mistletoe Bough
 Ginevra, a lyric drama written in 1913 by the Esperantist Edmond Privat
 Ginevra (horse), winner of the 1972 Oaks Stakes
 Ginevra, a 1992 Swedish film starring Amanda Ooms and Serge Maggiani

See also
Guinevere (disambiguation)